The 1980 Stockholm Open was a tennis tournament played on indoor hard courts. The men's event was part of the 1980 Volvo Grand Prix, while the women's was part of the 1980 WTA Tour and took place at the Kungliga tennishallen in Stockholm, Sweden. The women's tournament took part from 27 October through 1 November 1980 while the men's tournament was held from 4 November through 10 November 1980. Björn Borg and Hana Mandlíková won the singles titles.

Finals

Men's singles

 Björn Borg defeated  John McEnroe, 6–3, 6–4
 It was Borg's 8th singles title of the year and the 60th of his career.

Women's singles
 Hana Mandlíková defeated  Bettina Bunge, 6–2, 6–2

Men's doubles

 Heinz Günthardt /  Paul McNamee defeated  Bob Lutz /  Stan Smith, 6–7, 6–3, 6–2

Women's doubles
 Mima Jaušovec /  Virginia Ruzici defeated  Hana Mandlíková /  Betty Stöve, 6–2, 6–1

References

External links
  
 Association of Tennis Professionals (ATP) tournament profile
 1980 Stockholm Open at SVT's open archive 

Stockholm Open
Stockholm Open
Stockholm Open
Stockholm Open
Stockholm Open
1980s in Stockholm